The 2020–21 Ole Miss Rebels women's basketball team represented the University of Mississippi during the 2020–21 NCAA Division I women's basketball season. The Rebels, led by third-year head coach Yolett McPhee-McCuin, played their home games at The Pavilion at Ole Miss and competed as members of the Southeastern Conference (SEC). The Rebels finished the season 15–12 (4–10 SEC) and received an at-large bid to the Women's National Invitation Tournament, where they lost to Rice in the championship game.

Previous season
The Rebels finished the season with a 7–23 overall record and a 0–16 record in conference play. The Rebels lost to Missouri in the First Round of the SEC tournament. The Rebels were not invited to the postseason.

Offseason

Departures

2020 recruiting class

Incoming transfers

Offseason impact
The 2020 offseason was a strong one for third-year head coach Yolett McPhee-McCuin. Following the end of the 2019–20 season, Coach "Yo" added assistant coach Shay Robinson from Maryland following NCAA Tournament appearances in each of his six seasons with the Terrapins, including a Final Four appearance in 2015. The Rebels 2020 recruiting class was ranked 13th by ESPN. Following the recruiting class, the Rebels added two instant impact transfers. Tiya Douglas, a sophomore from Trinity Valley Community College in Texas, broke the TVCC single-game record and tied the NJCAA record with 13 three-pointers in a 44-point performance in her freshman season. Following Coach Robinson, Junior Shakira Austin transferred to Ole Miss from Maryland. At Maryland, Austin broke the school's single-season blocks record with 89 her freshman season. She was also on the 2019 All-Big Ten Freshman and Defensive Teams and 2020 All-Big Ten Second Team. Coming out of high school, Austin was a McDonald's All-American and ranked as the #4 overall prospect in the 2018 class. Austin will join freshman signees Jacorriah Bracey and Madison Scott as the third five-star prospect on the Rebels' roster. Austin will also join freshman signee Madison Scott as the first two McDonald's All-Americans in Ole Miss history.

Preseason

SEC media poll
The SEC media poll was released on November 17, 2020 with the Rebels selected to finish in eleventh place in the SEC.

Preseason All-SEC teams
The Rebels had one player selected to the preseason all-SEC teams.

Second team

Shakira Austin

Roster

Schedule

|-
!colspan=9 style=| Non-conference regular season

|-
!colspan=9 style=| SEC regular season

|-
!colspan=9 style=| SEC Tournament

|-
!colspan=9 style=| WNIT

See also
2020–21 Ole Miss Rebels men's basketball team

References

Ole Miss Rebels women's basketball seasons
Ole Miss
Ole Miss Rebels
Ole Miss Rebels
Ole Miss